The Nuclear Physics Institute of the Czech Academy of Sciences (Czech: Ústav Jaderné Fyziky Akademie věd ČR) is a public research institution located in Řež, Central Bohemian Region, Czech Republic. It was established in 1972 from the Physics Section of the former institute of Nuclear Research of the Czechoslovak Academy of Sciences.

History 

In 1955 the Nuclear Research Institute CSAS (originally called the Nuclear Physics Institute of the Czechoslovak Academy of Sciences) was founded as a basic institution for nuclear research. As the nuclear power industry developed in the Czech Republic, the institute was in 1972 divided into several parts. The largest part was subsided to the Czechoslovak Commission for Atomic Energy under the name Nuclear Research Institute and later privatized. The second largest part the Nuclear Physics Institute of the CAS remains under the Academy of Sciences.  Former Institute of Radiation Dosimetry CAS in Prague was connected to NPI as a detached branch in 1994.

Research 

Primary focus of the institute is nuclear physics, both theoretical and experimental. It carries out studies in the nuclear spectroscopy of beta and gamma radiation, nuclear reactions including the collisions of heavy ions and hyper-nuclear physics. Its work is also focused on related fields, such as the study of the solid phase using neutron scattering, mathematical physics and theoretical subnuclear physics.

Departments 
Director's Office
Technical and Economic Administration
Department of Theoretical Physics
Department of Nuclear Spectroscopy
Department of Nuclear Reactions
Department of Neutron Physics
Department of Radiopharmaceuticals
Department of Radiation Dosimetry
Department of Accelerators

Isochronous cyclotron U-120M 

Isochronous cyclotron U-120M is the primary experimental facility of the institute and it is the only cyclotron in the Czech Republic. It has been operating since 1977. The cyclotron is used both for fundamental research and applications. It can accelerate ions within the range of the mass-to-charge ratio A/q = 1 - 2.8. The present internal radial ion source is suitable for acceleration of H^+, D^+, 4-He^+2 and 3-He^+2. Maximum proton energy is 36 MeV, and the maximum energy for heavier ions is given by 40 q^2/A MeV. Currents of an internal beam of protons and deuterons can reach 100 microA, and for extracted beams 5 microA. Particles are extracted from the cyclotron chamber by means of a 3-section deflection electrostatic system to the entrance of the beam lines.

References 

1972 establishments in Czechoslovakia
Nuclear research institutes
Research institutes in the Czech Republic
Czech Republic
Science and technology in the Czech Republic
Scientific organizations established in 1992
Czech Academy of Sciences
Science and technology in Czechoslovakia
Research institutes established in 1972
1992 establishments in Czechoslovakia